6600K may refer to:
AMD A8-6600K, CPU released in 2013
Intel Core i5-6600K, CPU released in 2015